Air Southwest Ltd was an airline based in Chilliwack, British Columbia, Canada. It provided chartered flights throughout Western British Columbia, as well as a flight training school. Its main base was Chilliwack Airport. The airline was in operation from 1983 until 2005, and was a fully owned and operated subsidiary company of Emil Anderson Construction Company Ltd.

Destinations 
Air Southwest operated scheduled flights to Tipella, Silver River and Bear Creek airstrips located at the shores of Harrison Lake. Scheduled flights left Chilliwack on Monday evenings and Wednesday or Thursday afternoons.

Fleet 
1 Cessna 206 Stationair 
1 Cessna 182P Skylane

See also 
 List of defunct airlines of Canada

External links 
Emil Anderson Construction Company Ltd. website (Parent Company)
Canadian Transportation Agency Ruling

Airlines established in 1983
Airlines disestablished in 2005
Companies based in British Columbia
Chilliwack
Defunct airlines of Canada